The Three Alls Policy (Sankō Sakusen) was a Japanese scorched earth policy adopted in China during World War II, the three "alls" being . This policy was designed as retaliation against the Chinese for the Communist-led Hundred Regiments Offensive in December 1940.

The Chinese expression "Three Alls" was first popularized in Japan in 1957 when former Japanese soldiers released from the Fushun War Criminals Management Centre wrote a book called The Three Alls: Japanese Confessions of War Crimes in China (Sankō, Nihonjin no Chūgoku ni okeru sensō hanzai no kokuhaku) (new edition: Kanki Haruo, 1979) in which Japanese veterans confessed to war crimes committed under the leadership of General Yasuji Okamura. The publishers were forced to stop the publication of the book after they had received death threats from Japanese militarists and ultranationalists.

Description 

According to historian and sociologist Herbert Bix, the prototype of the Sankō Sakusen policy were the "annihilation campaigns" launched in late 1938 by the North China Area Army to "pacify" the Hebei province, which was a hotbed of guerrilla resistance. The Showa Emperor gave his approval of the "annihilation campaign" in an order he signed on 2 December 1938. The Imperial Japanese Army always saw the National Revolutionary Army and other forces loyal to the Kuomintang regime as their main enemy in China and tended to ignore the Chinese Communist forces, and by mid-1940, the Communists controlled vast tracts of the Chinese countryside, ruling over millions of people. In August 1940, the Eighth Route Army (created from the Chinese Red Army) launched the "100 Regiments Campaign", an offensive targeting bridge, railroads, mines, blockade houses and telephone lines in northern China that caused extensive damage. In response to the "100 Regiments" offensive, General  Ryūkichi Tanaka, commanding North China Area Army devised a plan for the "total annihilation" of the Communist base areas so that "the enemy could never use them again."

Initiated in 1940 by Major General Ryūkichi Tanaka, the Sankō Sakusen was implemented in full scale in 1942 in north China by General Yasuji Okamura who divided the territory of five provinces (Hebei, Shandong, Shensi, Shanhsi, Chahaer) into "pacified", "semi-pacified" and "unpacified" areas. The authorization of the policy was given by Imperial General Headquarters Order Number 575 on 3 December 1941. Okamura's strategy involved burning down villages, confiscating grain and mobilizing peasants to construct collective hamlets. It also centered on the digging of vast trench lines and the building of thousands of miles of containment walls and moats, watchtowers and roads to prevent guerrillas from moving around. These operations targeted for destruction "enemies pretending to be local people" and "all males between the ages of fifteen and sixty whom we suspect to be enemies".

In a study published in 1996, historian Mitsuyoshi Himeta claims that the Three Alls Policy, sanctioned by Emperor Hirohito himself, was both directly and indirectly responsible for the deaths of "more than 2.7 million" Chinese civilians. Drawing on Himeta's works and those of Akira Fujiwara, Herbert P. Bix wrote that the Sankō Sakusen far surpassed the Rape of Nanking not only in terms of numbers, but in brutality as well: "These military operations caused death and suffering on a scale incomparably greater than the totally unplanned orgy of killing in Nanking, which later came to symbolize the war." The effects of the Japanese strategy were further exacerbated by Chinese military tactics, which included the masking of military forces as civilians, or the use of civilians as deterrents against Japanese attacks. In some places, the Japanese also used chemical warfare against civilian populations in contravention of international agreements they refused to sign at the time.

Three Alls in Vietnam
On 17 August 1970, the North Vietnamese National Assembly Chairman Truong Chinh reprinted an article in Vietnamese in Nhan Dan, published in Hanoi titled "Policy of the Japanese Pirates Towards Our People" which was a reprint of his original article written in August 1945 in No. 3 of the Communist Magazine (Tap Chi Cong San) with the same title, describing Japanese atrocities like looting, slaughter and rape against the people of north Vietnam in 1945. He denounced the Japanese claims to have liberated Vietnam from France with the Greater East Asia Co-prosperity Sphere announced by Tojo and mentioned how the Japanese looted shrines, temples, eggs, vegetables, straw, rice, chickens, hogs and cattle for their horses and soldiers and built military stations and airstrips after stealing land and taking boats, vehicles, homes and destroying cotton fields and vegetable fields for peanut and jute cultivation in Annam and Tonkin. Japan replaced the French government on 9 March 1945 and started openly looting the Vietnamese even more in addition to taking French owned properties and stole watches, pencils, bicycles, money and clothing in Bac Giang and Bac Can. The Japanese tried to play the Vietnamese against the French and play the Laotians against the Vietnamese by inciting Lao people to killed Vietnamese as Lao murdered seven Vietnamese officials in Luang Prabang and Lao youths were recruited to an anti-Vietnam organization by the Japanese when they took over Luang Prabang. The Japanese spread false rumours that the French were massacring Vietnamese at the time, to distract the Vietnamese from Japanese atrocities. The Japanese created groups to counter the Viet Minh Communists like Vietnam Pao ve doan (Vietnam protection group) and Vietnam Ai quoc doan (Vietnam Patriotic Group) to force Vietnamese into coolie labour, take taxes and rice and arrested anti-Japanese Vietnamese with their puppet government run by Tran Trong Kim. The Viet Minh rejected the Japanese demands to cease fighting and support Japan, so the Japanese implemented the Three Alls policy (San Kuang) against the Vietnamese, pillaging, burning, killing, looting, and raping Vietnamese women. The Vietnamese called the Japanese "dwarfed monsters" (Wa (Japan)) and the Japanese committed these atrocities in Thai Nguyen province at Dinh Hoa, Vo Nhai and Hung Son. The Japanese attacked the Vietnamese while masquerading as Viet Minh and used terror and deception. The Japanese created the puppet Vietnam Phuc quoc quan (Vietnam restoration army). and tried to disrupt the Viet Minh's redistribution and confiscation of property of pro-Japanese Vietnamese traitors by disguising themselves as Viet Minh and then attacking people who took letters from them and organizing anti-French rallies and Trung sisters celebrations. Japanese soldiers tried to infiltrate Viet Minh bases with Viet Minh flags and brown trousers during their fighting. The Japanese murdered, plundered and raped Vietnamese and beheaded Vietnamese who stole bread and corn  while they were starving according to their martial law. They shot a Vietnamese pharmacy student to death outside of his own house when he was coming home from guard duty at a hospital after midnight in Hanoi and also shot a defendant for a political case in the same city. In Thai Nguyen province, Vo Nhai, a Vietnamese boat builder was thrown in a river and had his stomach stabbed by the Japanese under suspicion of helping Viet Minh guerillas. The Japanese slit the abdomen and hung the Dai Tu mayor upside down in Thai Nguyen as well. The Japanese also beat thousands of people in Hanoi for not cooperating. Japanese officers ordered their soldiers to behead and burn Vietnamese. Some claimed that Taiwanese and Manchurian soldiers in the Japanese army were participating in the atrocities against the Vietnamese but Truong Chinh said that even if it was true Taiwanese and Manchurian soldiers were committing the rapes and killing, their Japanese officers were the ones giving the orders and participating along with them. Truong Chinh said that the Japanese wanted to plunder Asians for their own market and take it from the United States and Great Britain and were imperialists with no intent on liberating Vietnam.

Truong Chinh wrote another article on 12 September 1945, No. 16 in Liberation Banner (Co Giai Phong) which was also reprinted on 16 August 1970 in Nhan Dan.  He commemorated the August revolution against the Japanese, after the Japanese surrendered on 15 August 1945 then the Viet Minh started attacking and slaughtering Japanese and disarming them in a nationwide rebellion on 19 August 1945. The Japanese had already disarmed the French and the Japanese themselves lost morale so the Viet Minh managed to seize control after attacking the Japanese. Viet Minh had begun fighting in 1944, when the French were attacked on Dinh Ca in October 1944 and in Cao Bang and Bac Can French were attacked by Viet Cong in November 1944 and the French and Japanese fought each other on 9 March 1945, so in Tonkin the Viet Cong began disarming French soldiers and attacking the Japanese.  In Quang Ngai, Ba To, Yen Bai and Nghia Lo political prisoners escaped Japanese were attake din Son La by Meo (Hmong) tribesmen and in Hoa Binh and Lang Son by Muong tribesmen.  Viet Minh took control of 6 provinces in Tonkin after 9 March 1945 within 2 weeks. The Viet Minh led a brutal campaign against the Japanese where many died from 9 March 1945 to 19 August 1945. Truong Chinh ended the article with a quote from Sun Yatsen, "The revolution is not yet won. All comrades must continue their all out efforts!"

In Hanoi on 15–20 April 1945 the Tonkin Revolutionary Military Conference of the Viet Minh issued a resolution that was reprinted on pages 1–4 on 25 August 1970 in the Nhan Dan journal. It called for a general uprising, resistance and guerilla warfare against the Japanese by establishing 7 war zones across Vietnam named after past heroes of Vietnam, calling for propaganda to explain to the people that their only way forward was violent resistance against the Japanese and exposing the Vietnamese puppet government that served them. The conference also called for training propagandists and having women spread military propaganda and target Japanese soldiers with Chinese language leaflets and Japanese language propaganda. The Viet Minh's Vietnamese Liberation Army published the "Resistance against Japan" (Khang Nhat) newspaper. They also called for the creation of a group called "Chinese and Vietnamese Allied against Japan" by sending leaflets to recruit overseas Chinese in Vietnam to their cause.  The resolution called on forcing French in Vietnam to recognize Vietnamese independence and for the DeGaulle France (Allied French) to recognize their independent and cooperate with them against Japan.

The Japanese forced Vietnamese women to become comfort women and with Burmese, Indonesia, Thai and Filipino women they made up a notable portion of Asian comfort women in general. Japanese use of Malaysian and Vietnamese women as comfort women was corroborated by testimonies. There were comfort women stations in Malaysia, Indonesia, Philippines, Burma, Thailand, Cambodia, Vietnam, North Korea and South Korea. A Korean comfort woman named Kim Ch'un-hui stayed behind in Vietnam and died there when she was 44 in 1963, owning a dairy farm, cafe, US cash and diamonds worth 200,000 US dollars. 1 million Vietnamese were starved to death during World War II according to Thomas U. Berger. 2 billion US dollars worth (1945 values) of damage, 148 million dollars of them due to destruction of industrial plants was incurred by Vietnam. 90% of heavy vehicles and motorcycles, cars and 16 tons of junks as well as railways, port installations were destroyed as well as one third of bridges. Some Japanese soldiers married Vietnamese women like Nguyen Thi Xuan and Nguyen Thi Thu and fathered multiple children with the Vietnamese women who remained behind in Vietnam while the Japanese soldiers themselves returned to Japan in 1955. The official Vietnamese historical narrative view them as children of rape and prostitution.

On 25 March 2000, the Vietnamese journalist Trần Khuê wrote an article "Dân chủ: Vấn đề của dân tộc và thời đại" where he harshly criticized ethnographers and historians in Ho Chin Minh city's Institute of Social Sciences like Dr. Đinh Văn Liên and Professor Mạc Đường who tried to whitewash Japan's atrocities against the Vietnamese by portraying Japan's aid to the South Vietnamese regime against North Vietnam as humanitarian aid, portraying the Vietnam war against America as a civil war. changing the death toll of 2 million Vietnamese dead at the hands of the Japanese famine to 1 million and calling the Japanese invasion as a presence and calling Japanese fascists at simply Japanese at the Vietnam-Japan international conference. He accused them of changing history in exchange for only a few tens of thousands of dollars, and the Presidium of international Vietnamese studies in Hanoi did not include any Vietnamese women. The Vietnamese professor Văn Tạo and Japanese professor Furuta Moto both conducted a study in the field on the Japanese induced famine of 1945 admitting that Japan killed 2 million Vietnamese by starvation.

Controversy and dispute

As with many aspects of Japan's World War II history, the nature and extent of Three Alls Policy is still a controversial issue. Japanese nationalist groups are particularly critical of accusations of brutality by the Imperial Japanese Army during the Sino-Japanese War, and deny that this policy existed. Conversely, in the People's Republic of China, the Three Alls Policy is used to support an anti-Japanese historical narrative.

In popular culture
The 2008 movie The Children of Huang Shi, which covers the Japanese invasion from 1938 to 1945, is set in part along the sankō sakusen.

Citations

General and cited references 
 Some of the content of this article comes from the equivalent Japanese-language article (accessed on April 7, 2006).
 
 Fujiwara, Akira (藤原彰). The Three Alls Policy and the Northern Chinese Regional Army (「三光作戦」と北支那方面軍), Kikan sensô sekinin kenkyû 20, 1998.
 
 

Genocide
Japanese war crimes
Second Sino-Japanese War